Clemensiella is a species of plants in the Apocynaceae first described as a genus in 1915. It was initially named Clemensia, in honour of Mary Strong Clemens and her husband Joseph. However this turned out to be an illegitimate homonym (in other words, someone else had already used the name for a different plant), so another name was chosen for this genus. Clemensiella contains only one known species, Clemensiella mariae, endemic to the Philippines.

References

Flora of the Philippines
Monotypic Apocynaceae genera